Ilia Vasilev Georgiev (born 21 January 1963) is a Bulgarian wrestler. He competed in the men's Greco-Roman 100 kg at the 1988 Summer Olympics.

References

External links
 

1963 births
Living people
Bulgarian male sport wrestlers
Olympic wrestlers of Bulgaria
Wrestlers at the 1988 Summer Olympics
People from Balchik